Battle River-Wainwright was a provincial electoral district in Alberta, Canada mandated to return a single member to the Legislative Assembly of Alberta using the first-past-the-post method of voting from 2004 to 2019.

History
The electoral district was created in the 2003 electoral boundary re-distribution primarily out of the old electoral district of Wainwright which had been in existence since the 1913 boundary redistribution.

The 2010 electoral boundary re-distribution saw significant changes to the district with Paintearth County being moved into Drumheller-Stettler. The district also lost land to Fort Saskatchewan-Vegreville that was south of Tofield, Alberta within Beaver County. However land was gained from three other electoral divisions that resided within Camrose County.

prior to 2019 election this district was disbanded to make the Vermilion-Lloydminster-Wainwright district.

Boundary history

Electoral history
The electoral district was created in the 2003 boundary redistribution mostly from the old Wainwright electoral district that had a long history going back to 1913. Since 1971 Progressive Conservative candidates had been returned to office here with large majorities.

The current incumbent and only representative so far is Doug Griffiths who was first elected in a 2002 by-election. He won the new district and his second term with a landslide majority which he also increased in the next election. In 2011 Griffiths was appointed to the cabinet in the government of Premier Allison Redford.

Legislature results

2004 general election

2008 general election

2012 general election

2015 general election

Senate nominee results

2004 Senate nominee election district results

Voters had the option of selecting 4 Candidates on the Ballot

2012 Senate nominee election district results

Student Vote results

2004 election

On November 19, 2004 a Student Vote was conducted at participating Alberta schools to parallel the 2004 Alberta general election results. The vote was designed to educate students and simulate the electoral process for persons who have not yet reached the legal majority. The vote was conducted in 80 of the 83 provincial electoral districts with students voting for actual election candidates. Schools with a large student body that reside in another electoral district had the option to vote for candidates outside of the electoral district then where they were physically located.

2012 election

See also
List of Alberta provincial electoral districts

References

External links
Elections Alberta
The Legislative Assembly of Alberta
Website of Wes Taylor Wildrose MLA for Battle River-Wainwright

Former provincial electoral districts of Alberta